York Central is a development on former railway land to the west of  in York, England. The  site is one of the largest brownfield developments in England. York Central is sometimes referred to as The Teardrop, because of the shape the development takes when viewed from above.

History
York City Council and other interested bodies, had been discussing the York Central site for at least a decade before outline approval was granted in 2020. In 2009, the project, then estimated to cost £1 billion, was shelved due to the worldwide recession. As the site to be developed is "landlocked by railway lines", York City Council set aside £10 million in 2014, to enable an access road to be built into the development from the A59 road. The designated area was granted Enterprise Zone status in November 2015.

The development occupies land that was previously used to maintain and store railway freight wagons. The East Coast Main Line would form a boundary to the east and the north, whilst the freight avoiding lines in York would border the south and west side. The developers stated in 2019 that 20% (500) of the homes would be affordable. In addition, a new entrance to York railway station would be built, facing towards the NRM, however, Leeman Road would be closed permanently where it runs adjacent to the NRM site. Plans from 2018 showed more six-storey apartment blocks than houses, cafes, restaurants, and a hotel in the centre of the commercial area, which is adjacent to the railway station.

The developer is York Central Partnership, which consists of Homes England, Network Rail, the National Railway Museum and York City Council. In June 2019, the project was costed at £650 million. York Central will also see the current main entrance into York railway station remodelled, including the removal of the Queen Street Bridge. The shape of the land to be developed, appears to look like a teardrop between two sets of railway lines, hence its alternative name.

With the launch of Great British Railways (GBR), a successor to Network Rail, there have been calls to site the GBR headquarters at York Central. Work on the site started with a clearance programme in January 2021, as part of the infrastructure works. In July 2022, construction company John Sisk & Son were contracted to begin work on £100 million of infrastructure including a bridge over the railway.

Access
Originally envisioned with an access road off the A59 at Holgate, the favoured vehicular access route is via a new spine road at Water End, on the east side of Severus Bridge (the A1176 road linking the A59 with the A19). This would entail building a road with bicycle and pedestrian access across Millennium Green. The only other road access into the development is constrained at both ends by bridges with height restrictions. Millennium Green is a  green space at the northern end of the York Central Development. Millennium Green is bounded on the west by the railway, and on the east by Holgate Beck.

York City councillors from the Green Party have expressed reservations about car use stating that the development should remain as low-carbon as possible, calling for an ultra-low sulphur zone with only buses allowed in regularly.

References

External links
 City of York Council – Major developments at York Central
 Artists' impression of the site
 Image of preferred vehicular access point from the north
 York Central Partnership

York
Buildings and structures in York